Scott Matthew Ullger (born June 10, 1955) is a retired Major League Baseball player and coach. He spent 20 seasons (1995–2014) as a coach for the Minnesota Twins of Major League Baseball, serving in four different roles: as third base and first base coach, bench coach and hitting instructor. Ullger was frequently referred to as "Scotty" by Twins faithfuls and by broadcasters Bert Blyleven and Dick Bremer.

Ullger, from Plainview, New York, was drafted by the Twins in 1977 and called up in  after a successful minor league career.  This did not, however, translate to big league success as Ullger played only 35 games in the majors, primarily at first base, all in the 1983 season.

After his playing career, he got into coaching. He also had successful runs with the Portland Beavers/Salt Lake Buzz when the team was the Twins' AAA affiliate.

In , Ullger became the Twins' first base coach. Following the  season, Ullger was shifted and became the Twins’ new third base coach, a position which he held through the 2010 season. In December 2010 it was announced he would become the Twins' bench coach, swapping roles with Steve Liddle. This allowed him to work more closely with Manager Ron Gardenhire.

In May , Ullger managed the team for five games due to the death of Ron Gardenhire's brother Mike, and for a road game in New York at the end of the month while Gardenhire attended his daughter's high school graduation.

External links

, or Retrosheet
Pura Pelota (Venezuelan Winter League)
Minnesota Twins Biography
Gardenhire hands over Twins to Ullger. Nystrom, Thor. MLB.com. May 30, 2008. Retrieved on October 12, 2008.

1955 births
Living people
Major League Baseball bench coaches
Major League Baseball first base coaches
Major League Baseball first basemen
Major League Baseball hitting coaches
Major League Baseball third base coaches
Minnesota Twins coaches
Minnesota Twins players
Navegantes del Magallanes players
Orlando Twins players
Portland Beavers managers
Rochester Red Wings players
Baseball players from New York City
St. John's Red Storm baseball players
Tigres de Aragua players
Venezuelan Professional Baseball League players by team
Toledo Mud Hens players
Visalia Oaks players
Wisconsin Rapids Twins players
American expatriate baseball players in Venezuela